Dinitrophenols are chemical compounds which are nitro derivatives of phenol.

There are six isomers of dinitrophenol:

 2,3-Dinitrophenol
 2,4-Dinitrophenol
 2,5-Dinitrophenol
 2,6-Dinitrophenol
 3,4-Dinitrophenol
 3,5-Dinitrophenol

Dinitrophenols also form the core structure of some herbicides, which are collectively referred to as dinitrophenol herbicides, including:

 Dinofenate
 Dinoprop
 Dinosam
 Dinoseb
 Dinoterb
 DNOC
 Etinofen
 Medinoterb